BBC Three was a British over-the-top Internet television service operated by the BBC. It was launched on 16 February 2016 as a replacement for the linear BBC Three television channel, which closed down the same day but was later relaunched on 1 February 2022. The service produces and streams television and web series aimed at the demographic of 16 to 34-year-olds, with a particular focus on comedy and documentary programming.

BBC Three content was primarily streamed on BBC iPlayer, while the service's other content, including web series and other materials, were also distributed through presences on social networks. All full-length original programming commissioned for BBC Three had to eventually be broadcast on the linear BBC One and BBC Two television channels following their online premiere. Beginning in March 2019, BBC One introduced a dedicated timeslot for BBC Three programmes on Mondays through Wednesdays following the BBC News at Ten.

On 20 May 2020, it was announced within the BBC's annual plan that the corporation is "considering the case" for returning BBC Three to linear television, four years after it was taken off air. The annual plan also stated that the BBC would be "backing the success" of the channel by doubling its budget, after producing a variety of critically acclaimed series including Normal People, Fleabag and This Country. Research released in September 2020 showed that BBC Three was being viewed for 89% less time per-year since the closure of its linear broadcast platform, and 72% if rebroadcasts of its content on other BBC linear channels were included. In the year after it closed its linear broadcast platform its weekly audience of viewers aged 16–34 declined 69% compared with the year before the closure. On 2 March 2021, the BBC Press office announced that BBC Three would return to digital terrestrial TV in February 2022, subject to regulatory approval which was approved in 2021.

History

Proposal 
In February 2014 at the Oxford Media Conference, BBC Director-General Tony Hall stated that as part of the ongoing "Delivering Quality First" initiative at the corporation (which, as motivated by the government freeze of television license fee costs, aims to reach £700 million in cost-savings across the BBC up to the end of the 2016–17 television season), the BBC was in the process of finalizing plans to make another £100 million in cuts to be announced the following month. Believing that general budget cuts across the entire corporation would compromise the quality of its in-house productions—especially dramas, which he described as being the "essence" of the BBC—Hall stated that these cuts could require "hard decisions" to be made. He explained that the corporation had "reached the point where salami-slicing would affect quality and distinctiveness. Rather than seek to preserve a less good version of our past, we decided to focus on what we do best: from drama to taking iPlayer into the next generation."

On 5 March 2014, the BBC announced several cost-savings proposals, subject to the approval of the BBC Trust. Among them were plans to discontinue BBC Three as a television channel, and convert it into an online service. In its proposal, the BBC stated that while motivated by financial considerations, the conversion was a "future-facing move" that would "develop a ground-breaking new online service which will bring high quality, distinctive UK-originated long form and new form interactive content to 16–34 year olds", and take advantage of the increased use of online services by the channel's target demographics. It was outlined that the service would have to leverage the "strengths" of BBC Three, such as curation, original productions, and "best-in-class storytelling", and adapt them to the "immediacy" and interactivity of digital.

As the service would not be bound to the limitations of linear schedules, the scope of the new BBC Three would fall under three "editorial pillars" as opposed to programming genres: "Make Me Laugh" reflects comedic and "personality-driven" programmes, and "Make Me Think" reflects current affairs, drama, and other factual programming. A third pillar, "Give Me a Voice", reflects that the service's content would be of topical interest to the 16–34 year-old demographic, and would encourage discussion and participation especially via social media. The overall programming budget of the service would be reduced by nearly half in comparison to the BBC Three channel. While it would have a larger focus on short-form web series, the service planned to continue investments into commissioning long-form programmes and "comedy at near current levels", and serving as an incubator for new talent. The service's output would primarily be delivered through iPlayer, but plans called for a revamped "branded space" to showcase the content, as well distributing short-form productions via alternative outlets such as YouTube.

The proposal faced criticism from notable parties, including Greg James, Matt Lucas and Jack Whitehall. Media writer Roy Greenslade considered the change to be "unquestionably the most sensible or perhaps the least worst" way of cutting costs. While admitting BBC Three's recent success in targeting its demographic and its role as a launchpad for new talent, he argued that BBC Three was "a marginal channel with a small share of the overall television audience", and that "'Hard decisions' are just that. If the BBC is to have any hope of sustaining its quality core output then a sacrifice had to be made."

Approval and launch 

The transition was finalised by the BBC Trust in November 2015. The trust cited the shifting viewing habits of BBC Three's target audience from linear TV to digital services, and that the discontinuation of BBC Three as a television channel would allow the BBC to "deliver more distinctive content online, while bearing down on costs". Conditions were imposed on other BBC properties to complement the changes; BBC One and Two will be required to develop "distinctive programmes designed for younger audiences", as well as air repeats of all full-length programmes commissioned for BBC Three. The trust also approved related proposals to allow first-run and third-party content on iPlayer, and extend CBBC's broadcast day to 9:00 p.m. (CBBC signed off at 7:00 p.m. to conserve Freeview bandwidth for BBC Three) with a focus on an older youth audience.

On 4 January 2016, it was announced that the new BBC Three digital service would launch on 16 February 2016. The same day, a new logo for the service was unveiled. Inspired by the iconography of mobile applications, the new logo incorporates the Roman numeral for the number three, with the third bar replaced by an exclamation mark. Marketing head Nikki Carr explained that the three bars represented the aforementioned "editorial pillars" (with the exclamation mark representing the "Give Me a Voice" aspect). The new logo received mixed reactions from the public, with some drawing comparisons to the album cover of Plan B's Ill Manors, a Roman numeral "2" with an exclamation point ("BBC Two!"), and a proposed redesign of the BBC's logo seen in an episode of the comedy W1A. In regards to the W1A comparison, Carr joked that "thanks to W1A we're cursed at the BBC when it comes to marketing and I don't want to come across all Siobhan Sharpe but forgive me some lingo." The channel also parodied the comparisons in a Vine video.

BBC Three controller Damian Kavanagh explained that the new digital service would feature the "same award-winning programmes freed from the constraints of linear TV", emphasizing the ability to distribute content across "whatever format and platform is most appropriate". Hall described the internal atmosphere surrounding the new BBC Three as being like a "startup", explaining that "I love the feeling of going and being with Damian's team. It feels creative, energetic and mischievous as well, just as it should be." Kavanagh felt that the concise "pillars" of BBC Three, combined with its new structure, would give creators more flexibility and immediacy in how they produce content. He explained that "we can allow people to do things that I don't think other broadcasters can really do at the moment—in terms of giving people room to try things and also play around with form in a way we couldn’t have done if we'd stayed on television", with the remainder of the BBC's content ecosystem as a "safety net". Kavanagh also emphasized a continued goal to use the service as an incubator for new talent, hoping that it will be remembered as "the place that spotted the next James Corden, the next Aidan Turner, the next whoever."

On 13 February 2016, prior to the service's launch, it was reported that the BBC was considering merging BBC Three and BBC Radio 1 under unified management if the digital BBC Three service is not successful. Kavanagh stated that he himself was unaware of this proposal, but added that BBC Three was "a really powerful youth brand with 13 years' heritage" and that he "[didn't] see the logic in winding down something that has that audience, and has that badge of quality, and has that heritage."

The BBC Three television channel formally signed off during the early morning of 16 February 2016, concurrent with the official re-launch of the new BBC Three. The last programme aired was an episode of Gavin & Stacey, introduced by its co-star James Corden from the set of his current U.S. chat show The Late Late Show in Los Angeles.

Linear relaunch 
On 2 March 2021 the BBC announced that BBC Three would relaunch as a linear broadcast channel from 2022, reversing the action of 2016. In November 2021 regulator Ofcom confirmed that the channel would return to television in February 2022. The relaunched BBC Three linear television channel returned to Freeview, Sky, Virgin and Freesat from 1 February 2022.

Content 
The new BBC Three service was delivered primarily via iPlayer, offering new, original content, as well as full series of previous BBC Three programmes (branded as "Box Sets"). New content consisted of full-length programmes, and short-form web series and features; Kavanagh explained that the new BBC Three would focus primarily on original comedies and documentaries. All long-form programmes commissioned for BBC Three had to be aired at a later date on BBC One or BBC Two. In February 2019, it was announced that BBC Three programmes would air Mondays through Wednesdays on BBC One on following the News at Ten, beginning on 4 March 2019.

Despite the refocus on comedy, the proportion of the channel's output (in minutes) devoted to comedy actually fell post-switch, from 41% to 33%. By contract, the proportions of the channel's output devoted to factual programming did increase.

BBC Three produced two curated content channels, such as The Daily Drop—which featured blogs, videos, photo galleries, social network content, and other content trending online—and The Best Of. 20% of the outlet's budget will go towards web series.

Programmes from the former BBC Three channel were carried over, including new series of Cuckoo, Life and Death Row and People Just Do Nothing. The initial slate of new programs to debut through BBC Three included the Doctor Who spin-off Class (which was cancelled after a single series), the new dramas Clique and Thirteen, Live from the BBC, a stand-up comedy series focusing on up and coming comedians; the three-part web series  The Man Who Witnessed 219 Executions; and Unsolved: The Boy Who Disappeared. Promoted as being a British equivalent to the web series Serial, Unsolved would feature weekly instalments investigating a real-life crime story. The service also produced a series of short films in collaboration with Idris Elba and up and coming talent. In 2017, the millennial relationship series Just a Couple premiered 

With the service's budget cut to £30 million, some of BBC Three's historic staples, such as panel shows, Don't Tell the Bride, and U.S. animated comedy Family Guy were dropped. Some BBC Three series had already been moved to other outlets in anticipation of the shutdown; Russell Howard's Good News was moved to BBC Two in 2014, and Don't Tell the Bride was moved to BBC One for a single series before being dropped and acquired by Sky 1. ITV2 acquired rights to new episodes of Family Guy and other Seth MacFarlane series in March 2015, although the BBC continued to hold rights to past episodes of Family Guy until 2017.

The annual minutes of programming being made available by BBC Three on iPlayer after the channel closed its broadcast platform was around 80% less than the annual minutes of programming broadcast before the closure.

The comedy-drama Fleabag premiered on BBC Three in 2016, and was renewed for a second series premiering in 2019. The series achieved critical acclaim, with its second series receiving 11 nominations at the 2019 Primetime Emmy Awards (on behalf of U.S. co-production partner Amazon Video) and winning in six categories—including Outstanding Comedy Series. The following year, Normal People received four nominations at the 2020 Primetime Emmy Awards (on behalf of U.S. co-production partner Hulu).

In 2019, BBC Three premiered RuPaul's Drag Race UK, an adaptation of the American reality drag competition series RuPaul's Drag Race. In 2020, it was announced that BBC Three had acquired the UK broadcast rights to Canada's Drag Race.

References

External links 
 

2016 establishments in the United Kingdom
2022 disestablishments in the United Kingdom
BBC New Media
Internet television channels
Internet properties established in 2016
Internet properties disestablished in 2022